Trilocha arabica is a moth in the Bombycidae family. It was described by Wiltshire in 1982. It is found in Saudi Arabia.

References

Natural History Museum Lepidoptera generic names catalog

Bombycidae
Moths described in 1982